Whalers Bluff Lighthouse is a lighthouse on Whalers Bluff, also known as Whalers Point, in the regional city of Portland in the Western District of the state of Victoria in Australia. It stands about 1.5 km north of the city centre and overlooks Portland's harbour. It is operated by the Victorian Channels Authority, part of the Port of Melbourne Corporation.

History
The lighthouse was originally built at Battery Point in Portland in 1859 and was known as the Portland Bay Light. In 1889 it was relocated, stone by stone, to Whalers Bluff in order to make room for gun emplacements at Battery Point.

See also

 List of lighthouses in Australia

Notes

Sources

 
 

Lighthouses completed in 1859
Lighthouses in Victoria (Australia)
1889 establishments in Australia
Portland, Victoria